Terry Wayne Brown (March 14, 1950 – September 4, 2014) was a Republican politician from the U.S. state of Mississippi, who served in the Mississippi Senate, representing the 17th district, and as the Senate President pro tempore.

A native of Columbus, Mississippi, Brown played football for East Mississippi Junior College. He died of cancer at the age of sixty-four. He is interred at Pleasant Hill Cemetery in Lowndes County, Mississippi. He was survived by his wife, Andra, and their three sons.

References

1950 births
2014 deaths
Republican Party Mississippi state senators
People from Columbus, Mississippi
21st-century American politicians
Deaths from cancer in Mississippi